Palkaneh may refer to:
 Palkaneh, Ilam
 Palkaneh-ye Sofla, Ilam Province
 Palkaneh, Kermanshah